An ordinance or ecclesiastical ordinance is a type of law, legal instrument, or by-law in the canon law of the Catholic Church, the Anglican Communion, and in Calvinism.

Anglican Communion

In the Anglican Communion, particularly the American Episcopal Church, ecclesiastical ordinances are the bylaws of a Christian religious organization, especially that of a diocese or province of a church.

Catholic Church

In the canon law of the Catholic Church, ecclesiastical ordinances are particular laws, issued in order to fulfil universal law on a local or regional level.

Calvinism
Ecclesiastical Ordinances is the title of the foundation rules, or constitution, of the Reformed Church in Geneva, written by John Calvin in 1541. They were revised in 1561.

See also
 Anglicanism
 Calvinism
 Catholic Church
 Church Order (Lutheran)
 Ecclesiastical court
 Ordinance (Christianity)

References

External links
 Ordinances of the Roman Catholic province of Canada
 Ordinances of Province VII of the Episcopal Church

Canon law
Christian terminology